Brigadier (r) Mansoor-ul-Haq Malik was a one star officer of the Pakistan Army Corps of Signals. He had also served as Director General of the Pakistan Telephone & Telegraph Department (T&T) which is now PTCL and as Managing Director of the Overseas Pakistanis Foundation.

Army career
Malik had been a member of the Pakistan Army Corps of Signals throughout his army career during which he also commanded a full brigade. He was active in both the 1965 Indo-Pakistani War as well as in the 1971 Indo-Pakistani War. Malik was taken as prisoner of war in the latter and documented that experience by writing the Urdu book Jangi Qaidi Ki Diary (English: Diary of a prisoner of war).

Non-military positions

In addition to his army positions Malik has headed the Pakistan Telephone & Telegraph Department and the Overseas Pakistanis Foundation.

Death

Malik was en route from Pakistan to the United States when he suddenly suffered a heart attack at London Heathrow Airport. He was rushed to the hospital but did not survive.

Family
Malik's youngest brother is Admiral (r) Yastur-ul-Haq Malik. His 3 elder brothers have also served in Pakistan's Armed Forces. Malik's Eldest brother was Commodore (r) Ikram-ul-Haq Malik
Followed by Brigadier (r) Zahur-ul-Haq Malik and Lieutenant colonel (r) Manzur-ul-Haq Malik
Malik's youngest sister is Safura Zafar

Malik has six children, two daughters and  four sons.

Literature
Jangi Qaidi Ki Diary (English: Diary of a prisoner of war)

References

Pakistani corporate directors
Pakistan Army officers
1929 births
2005 deaths